Roanoke Warehouse Historic District, also known as 'Wholesale Row," is a national historic district located at Roanoke, Virginia.  It encompasses five contributing buildings constructed between 1889 and 1902.  All the buildings are constructed of brick, two-to-four stories in height and three-to-eleven bays in length.  Two of the buildings have exceptional corbeled stepped gables in a Dutch-vernacular tradition.  The buildings were erected for wholesale food storage.

It was listed on the National Register of Historic Places in 1983.

References

Historic districts on the National Register of Historic Places in Virginia
Industrial buildings and structures on the National Register of Historic Places in Virginia
Industrial buildings completed in 1902
Buildings and structures in Roanoke, Virginia
National Register of Historic Places in Roanoke, Virginia
Warehouses on the National Register of Historic Places